The ashy-headed flying fox or North Moluccan flying fox (Pteropus caniceps) is a species of bat in the family Pteropodidae. It is endemic to Indonesia.

Taxonomy and etymology
It was described as a new species in 1870 by British zoologist John Edward Gray.
The holotype had been collected on the Bacan Islands by Alfred Russel Wallace.
Its species name "caniceps" means "gray-headed" from Latin canus (gray) and -ceps (headed).
This species has two subspecies:
P. c. caniceps
P. c. dobsoni (named for zoologist George Edward Dobson)

Description

Range and habitat
This species is endemic to Indonesia.

Conservation
As of 2016, it is assessed as a vulnerable species by the IUCN.
It meets the criteria for this assessment because its population decline has been at least 30% from 1992–2016.
Additionally, it is experiencing habitat fragmentation, and it is losing habitat due to logging and mining activities.

References

Pteropus
Mammals of Indonesia
Mammals described in 1870
Taxonomy articles created by Polbot
Taxa named by John Edward Gray
Bats of Indonesia